Basic Education High School No. 1 Insein (commonly known as Insein 1 High School) is a public high school in Insein township, Yangon. The school's main building is a landmark protected by the city, and is listed on the Yangon City Heritage List.

References

High schools in Yangon